Nicolás Eduardo Castro (born 11 May 1990) is an Argentine professional footballer who plays as a winger or midfielder for Patronato.

Career
Castro started with Gimnasia y Esgrima, signing in 2004. In 2009, Castro was loaned to Liniers of Torneo Argentino B. One goal in twenty-three appearances followed. He returned to his parent club in 2010, subsequently making his debut in the Copa Argentina versus Sportivo Desamparados on 30 November 2011. A second loan spell away arrived in August 2012, with the midfielder signing for Juventud Unida Universitario. He made his bow in a 3–1 loss to Rivadavia on 26 August. Castro left Gimnasia y Esgrima in 2013, joining Unión Mar del Plata. Season two ended with promotion.

After scoring goals versus Guaraní Antonio Franco, Independiente Rivadavia and Chacarita Juniors in his debut second tier campaign as they were relegated, Castro then completed a move to Crucero del Norte to remain in Primera B Nacional. Castro played in fifty-seven games and netted seven goals across all competitions in two seasons with Chacarita Juniors, with his last two goals coming in a 3–0 win over Estudiantes in April 2017. In the succeeding August, having suffered his second career relegation, Quilmes completed the signing of Castro. Thirteen appearances occurred with them.

Ten months later, Castro agreed to join his seventh senior team in Sarmiento. His first appearance was in a fixture with Olimpo on 26 August, as he featured for eighty-five minutes before being substituted for Juan Caviglia.

Career statistics
.

References

External links

1990 births
Living people
People from General Paz Partido
Argentine footballers
Association football midfielders
Torneo Argentino B players
Torneo Argentino A players
Torneo Federal A players
Primera Nacional players
Club de Gimnasia y Esgrima La Plata footballers
Liniers de Bahía Blanca players
Juventud Unida Universitario players
Unión de Mar del Plata footballers
Crucero del Norte footballers
Quilmes Atlético Club footballers
Club Atlético Sarmiento footballers
San Martín de Tucumán footballers
Arsenal de Sarandí footballers
Club Atlético Patronato footballers
Sportspeople from Buenos Aires Province